Artistic Vice is the first studio album by singer-songwriter Daniel Johnston, and his twelfth overall, counting his nine widely distributed demo tapes, two earlier aborted attempts at studio albums, (Continued Story and 1990), and collaboration with Jad Fair, It's Spooky. It was his first full-length album recorded after a three-year hiatus. The album is considered more light-hearted than its predecessor, 1990.

Unlike his earlier CD releases, this one features the same track listings as both the LP and cassette.

Background

Writing 
Following his year-long stay at Weston Mental Hospital, Johnston recorded the Laurie EP in December 1989, the title track of which is featured on this album.

A few months later, after the release of Johnston's 1990 album, Johnston was invited to promote it with three short performances at SXSW. Instead of performing material from the album, Johnston debuted new material and reworked selections from his 1983 demo tapes. Johnston premiered four songs at these shows, 'Silly Love,' 'Do You Really Love Me?', 'A Lonely Song' & 'Love Wheel.' 'Do You Really Love Me?'' was eventually re-worked into 'Tell Me Now', and the rest were shelved for future releases.

Immediately following the performances, Johnston was hospitalized for five months between March and August 1990, after causing his father to crash his plane into a forest amidst a delusional episode. During this period Johnston's popularity continued to rise, partially thanks to Homestead Records' continued re-issues of his earlier tapes, concluding in 1991 with a cassette / LP version of Continued Story, and the 'Continued Story / Hi, How Are You' CD. During this time Firehose' cover of Walking The Cow was released on their Flyin' the Flannel album, and The Pastels released their cover of Speeding Motorcycle, continuing to boost Johnston's notoriety as a songwriter.

The songwriting style on this album showcases Johnston's commercial ambitions, and slyly nods to his growing fame. The lyrics also refer to Johnston's improving mental state, in particular the song 'I Killed The Monster' confidently boasts that Johnston had defeated his personal demons.

Recording 
Johnston recorded the album in July 1991 at Chuck Picklesimer's house in his home state of West Virginia. For the album, he formed The Eye Band; a backing band made up entirely of Johnston's friends. The sessions were produced by Kramer, responsible for his previous album, 1990. Although the sessions took place in West Virginia, by late 1991, the Johnston family had relocated to Waller, Texas. 

Once the album was completed, Johnston excluded the song "I Killed The Monster", as he realised his inner demons were far from defeated.

The album is dedicated to Laurie Allen, Johnston's muse who he had not seen in over a decade at that point. A copy of the album had been sent to her. Johnston was thrilled to find she enjoyed the album.

Critical reception

Trouser Press called the album an "ebullient blast of lo-fi electric garage-rock," writing that "the glimmers of deliverance make this cogent album as encouraging as it is enjoyable."

Legacy 
Two years after the album was released, Television Personalities released a cover of 'Honey I Sure Miss You'. That same year, Terry Burrows, under the pseudonym of Yukio Yung, released a cover of 'I Feel So High'.

In 2004, Jad Fair and Teenage Fanclub collaborated on a cover of "My Life Is Starting Over Again" for the Daniel Johnston tribute album The Late Great Daniel Johnston: Discovered Covered. A few years later, in 2006, the album's producer Kramer performed bass and keyboards on a cover of "Honey I Sure Miss You". That same year, Jad Fair and Teenage Fanclub released a cover of "Happy Soul".

In a 2009 interview, Jeffrey Lewis cited Artistic Vice specifically as an influence on his songwriting.

In 2019, The New York Times included "My Life is Starting Over" in their list of Johnston's 12 essential tracks. The following year the album was reissued on vinyl as part of the box set The End Is Never Really Over. That same year Built To Spill covered "Tell Me Now" and "Honey I Sure Miss You" as part of their Johnston tribute album, and folk supergroup I Was A King, featuring Frøkedal, Norman Blake and Robyn Hitchcock, released their cover of "Honey I Sure Miss You".

Track listing

Credits 

 Daniel Johnston: Vocals, Acoustic Guitar

Eye Band

 Brent Conkle & Donny Spencer: Lead Guitar
 Dale Dudgeon & Tom Gruda: Rhythm Guitar
 Mike West: Bass Guitar
 Fred McMahan: Drums

Production

 Kramer: Producer & Engineer

References 

Daniel Johnston albums
1991 albums
Albums produced by Kramer (musician)
Shimmy Disc albums